Fitzpatrick "Monbo" Bokar (born June 17, 1993) is a Liberian footballer who most recently played for San Antonio Scorpions.

Career

College
Bokar played college soccer initially at North Carolina State University in 2011, before transferring to UNC Charlotte in 2013.

Professional
Bokar signed with North American Soccer League side San Antonio Scorpions on June 24, 2015. The club ceased operations at the end of 2015.

References

External links
 

1993 births
Living people
Liberian footballers
Liberian expatriate footballers
NC State Wolfpack men's soccer players
Charlotte 49ers men's soccer players
North Carolina Fusion U23 players
San Antonio Scorpions players
Association football defenders
Expatriate soccer players in the United States
USL League Two players
North American Soccer League players
Sportspeople from Monrovia